The 2017–18 Coupe de France preliminary rounds, Nouvelle-Aquitaine make up the qualifying competition to decide which teams from the French Nouvelle-Aquitaine take part in the main competition from the seventh round.

First round 
These matches were played between 25 August and 3 September 2017. 

First Round Results: Nouvelle Aquitaine

Second round 
These matches were played between 2 and 10 September 2017.

Second round results: Nouvelle Aquitaine

Third round 
These matches were played between 9 and 16 September 2017.

Third round results: Nouvelle Aquitaine

Fourth round 
These matches were played on 23 and 24 September 2017.

Fourth round results: Nouvelle Aquitaine

Fifth round 
These matches were played on 7 and 8 October 2017.

Fifth round results: Nouvelle Aquitaine

Sixth round 
These matches were played on 21 and 22 October 2017.

Sixth round results: Nouvelle Aquitaine

Notes

References 

2017–18 Coupe de France